Attock Cantonment is a cantonment adjacent to the city of Attock in Punjab province, Pakistan.

The Attock Cantonment features numerous community services and landmarks such as schools, colleges, shopping malls, hospitals, residential areas, as well as a specialized Center for the Pakistan Army.

References

Cantonments of Pakistan